Nescafé Basement is a Pakistani music television series which features studio-recorded performances by underground and emerging artists. The show is produced by Nescafé. The artists are recruited and mentored by Xulfi, who is also the music producer of the show. The first song released from Nescafé Basement was a cover of Sajjad Ali's "Larri Adda".

Season 1 
In September 2012, the brand went around college campuses looking for young, exceptionally talented, but unknown musicians who could sing and play a variety of instruments. The 15 best musicians were then mentored by Xulfi from the band Call.

Season 2 
Out of 1,253 young artists who auditioned (compared to only 98 for the first season), Xulfi selected 19 (whereas 14 were selected last season) from major cities across the country.

Nescafe Basement 2 had eight weekly episodes, each showcasing two songs with behind-the-scenes documentaries which highlight the journey of hidden musical prodigies. Apart from television broadcasts, the show will also have a digital component that includes their website, Facebook page and Twitter.

Notable Performers 

 Abdullah Qureshi (Singer)
Leo Twins

Awards 
 Winner in Hot Beverages - PAS Awards 2013
 Most Magnetic Branded Content - Maxus Magnets Award 2013

See also 

 Music of Pakistan
 Coke Studio
 Uth Records
Acoustic Station

References

External links 
 
 
 
 
 

Pakistani music television series